Musik, dans & party 9 is a 1994 studio album by Sten & Stanley.

Track listing
"Jag ger dig en blomma" (Gunnarsson - Lord)
"Så jag tog gitarren" (Gunnarsson - Lord)
"Corrine, Corrina" (J.M. Williams - B. Chatman - M. Parish)
"En vind som blåser" (G. Reis - L-Å. Andersson)
"Bara när jag blundar" (T. Andersson - H. Pärn)
"Leka med elden" ("Ginny Come Lately") (G. Geld - P. Udell - A. Forss)
"Nu leker livet igen" ("Love's Gonna Live Here") (B. Owens - M. Forsberg)
"Mina ord till dig" (Wendt - Lundh)
"Kommer du till sommaren" (Gunnarsson - Lord)
"Adress Rosenhill" ("Mockin' Bird Hill") (V. Horton - G. Carnerstam)
"Jag ser en bit av himlen" (S. Nilsson - K. Almgren - S. Nilsson)
"Min" ("Still") (D. Burton - H. Plummer - M. Forsberg)
"Någonstans i Spanien" ("Spanish Harlem") (P. Spector - J. Leiber - O. Bergman)

Charts

References 

1994 albums
Sten & Stanley albums